Sedes Airport is a military airport 15 km east of Thessaloniki, Greece, and 3 km northeast of Thessaloniki's Makedonia International Airport. Sedes airport started operating during the Balkan Wars and has since been exclusively used by the Hellenic Air Force. Nowadays it also houses an aviation museum, displaying a variety of old aircraft types.

References

Airports in Greece
Transport infrastructure in Central Macedonia
Hellenic Air Force bases
Buildings and structures in Thessaloniki (regional unit)